Repa may refer to:

People
 Matúš Repa (born 2002), Slovak football player
 Vojtěch Řepa (born 2000), Czech cyclist
 Waltraut Peck-Repa (1940–1998), Austrian foil fencer

Other
 Repa (genus), a genus of moths
 Râpa (Mureș), a tributary of the river Mureș, Romania